Jean-François Lapointe is a Canadian baritone opera singer.

Career

Born in the region of Saguenay–Lac-Saint-Jean, Quebec, Jean-François Lapointe first studied piano and violin and, at the age of 16, devoted himself entirely to singing. He worked under the direction of Louise André at Université Laval in Quebec City, where he obtained a master's degree in Interpretation, before pursuing advanced studies in the United States with Martial Singher. He has received many awards, including three at the prestigious Concours international de chant de Paris.

Since his stage debut at the age of 17, Jean-François Lapointe has sung more than sixty roles in numerous major opera houses around the world.
Highly regarded as a lyric baritone for his many major roles in that repertoire, he became famous for his performance of the eponymous role in Ambroise Thomas' Hamlet, in Copenhagen, Trieste and Geneva, as well as of Mercutio (Roméo et Juliette) in Cincinnati, Orange and Tokyo. He also sang the role of Valentin (Faust) a great many times over his career, namely in Turin, Madrid, Monte-Carlo, as well as Orange in August 2008. More recently, he sang the role of Albert (Werther) in the Théatre de la Monnaie in Brussels. Over the past few seasons, Jean-François Lapointe made his debut in the roles of Chorèbe, (Les Troyens) in Geneva, Escamillo, (Carmen), in Lausanne, France and in Japan, and of Zurga, (Les pêcheurs de perles), at the Opera of Toulon, in January 2009.

His performance of Pelléas (2005) in Debussy's Pelléas et Mélisande became a career-defining moment, a role he sang in North America (including Toronto and Cincinnati) as well as Europe: he worked under the direction of Yannis Kokkos in Bordeaux, Toulouse and at la Scala of Milan in November 2005. The Parisian audience saw his Pelléas in June 2007, under the direction of Bernard Haitink, in Théâtre des Champs-Élysées.

Jean-François Lapointe is also known for his dedication at championing neglected operatic works. He thus took part in the première of Bernstein's Candide to a French libretto, and went on to perform the role in France and throughout Europe. He also collaborated to the re-creation of Mârouf, savetier du Caire, at the Opera of Marseille, and to the production of La jolie fille de Perth in Compiègne (France).

Thanks to his stage presence and his acting skills, he achieved great success in the operetta repertoire, performing the roles of Brissac, (Les mousquetaires au couvent), to great acclaim in Toulouse, le Vice-roi du Pérou (la Périchole) in Marseille and Nancy, and especially Danilo, (La veuve joyeuse) in Montréal, Bordeaux, Liège and Lausanne.

Though a noted performer of the French opera repertoire, Jean-François Lapointe also made his mark in the Italian and Russian repertoire: he sang Figaro (Le Barbier de Seville) at the Opéra Comédie, Count Almaviva (Les Noces de Figaro) in Nancy and Don Giovanni in Trieste. He recently added the role of Prince Eletski to his repertoire, in Pikovaya Dama, which he performed at the Opéra de Monte-Carlo with conductor Dmitri Jurowski and stage director Guy Joosten.

Productions since 2005

2004 

 Fieramosca, Benvenuto Cellini, Hector Berlioz, Paris

2005 

 Le Vice-Roi du Pérou, La Périchole, J. Offenbach, Montpellier
 Valentin, Faust, C. Gounod, Monaco
 Danilo, The Merry Widow, F. Lehár, Marseille
 Danilo, La Veuve joyeuse, F. Lehár, Bordeaux
 Pelléas, Pelléas et Mélisande, C. Debussy, Glasgow
 Pelléas, Pelléas et Mélisande, C. Debussy, Edimburg
 Pelléas, Pelléas et Mélisande, C. Debussy, Milan
 Andrews, Titanic, M. Yeston, Liège

2006 

 Andrews, Titanic, M. Yeston, Charleroi
 Hamlet, Hamlet, A. Thomas, Genève
 Danilo, La Veuve joyeuse, F. Lehár, Liège
 Valentin, Faust, C. Gounod, Liège
 Figaro, Il Barbiere di Siviglia, Rossini, Paris (Opéra-Comique)
 Il Comte Almaviva, Le Nozze di Figaro, W.A. Mozart, Nancy
 Danilo, La Veuve Joyeuse, F. Lehár, Lausanne

2007 

 Pelléas, Pelléas et Mélisande, C. Debussy, Toulon
 Pelléas, Pelléas et Mélisande, C. Debussy, Liège
 Don Giovanni, Don Giovanni, W. A. Mozart, Trieste
 Pelléas, Pelléas et Mélisande, C. Debussy, Paris (Théâtre des Champs-Elysées)
 Chorèbe, Les Troyens, H. Berlioz, Genève
 Albert, Werther, J. Massenet, Bruxelles

2008 

 Escamillo, Carmen, G. Bizet, Lausanne, Vichy
 Direction musicale, La Belle Hélène, Offenbach, Rimouski (Quebec)
 Valentin, Faust, C. Gounod, Orange
 Escamillo, Carmen, G. Bizet, Japan

2009 

 Zurga, Les Pêcheurs de perles, G. Bizet, Toulon
 Claudio, Béatrice et Bénédict, H. Berlioz, Paris (Théâtre des Champs-Elysées)
 Eletski, La Dame de pique, P.I. Tchaikovski, Monaco
 Escamillo, Carmen, G. Bizet, Hyogo, Tokyo, Nagoya
 Pelléas, Pelléas et Mélisande, C. Debussy, Rome
 Landry, Fortunio, A. Messager, Paris (Opéra Comique)

2010 

 Ford, Falstaff, G. Verdi, Paris (TCE)
 Chorèbe, Les Troyens, H. Berlioz, Amsterdam
 Énée, Dido and Æneas, H. Purcell, Lausanne, Vichy
 Direction musicale, Carmen, G. Bizet, Rimouski (Quebec)
 Escamillo, Carmen, G. Bizet, Barcelona
 Chorèbe, Les Troyens, H. Berlioz, Berlin

2011 

 Don Giovanni, Don Giovanni, W.A. Mozart, Marseille
 Nevers, Les Huguenots, G. Meyerbeer, Bruxelles
 Oreste, Iphigénie en Tauride, C.W. von Glück, Amsterdam
 Eugène Onéguine, Eugene Onegin, P.I. Tchaikovski, Quebec
 Raimbaud, Le Comte Ory, G. Rossini, Genève

2012 

 L'Horloge comtoise / Le Chat, L'Enfant et les Sortilèges, M. Ravel, Monaco
 Garrido, La Navarraise, J. Massenet, Monaco
 Ford, Falstaff, G. Verdi, Quebec
 Zurga, Les Pêcheurs de perles, G. Bizet, Amsterdam
 Escamillo, Carmen, G. Bizet, Marseille
 Amrou, Le Mage, J. Massenet, St-Étienne
 Giorgio Germont, La Traviata, G. Verdi, Frankfurt

2013 

 Giorgio Germont, La Traviata, G. Verdi, Frankfurt
 Duparquet, Ciboulette, R Hahn, Paris (Opéra Comique)
 Marquis de la Force, Dialogues des Carmélites, F. Poulenc, Toronto
 Marc-Antoine, Cléopâtre, J. Massenet, Marseille
 Le Grand Prêtre, Alceste, C.W. von Glück, Paris (Palais Garnier)
 Alphonse XI, La Favorite, G. Donizetti, Monaco, Paris (Théâtre des Champs-Élysées)

2014 

 Albert, Werther, J. Massenet, Paris (Bastille)
 Golaud, Pelléas et Mélisande, C. Debussy, Angers, Nantes
 Le mari, Les Mamelles de Tirésias, F. Poulenc, London (Barbican)
 Giorgio Germont, La Traviata, G. Verdi, Marseille
 Golaud, Pelléas et Mélisande, C. Debussy, Helsinki
 Pharaon, Moïse et Pharaon, G. Rossini, Marseille

2015 

 L'Horloge Comtoise / Le Chat, L'Enfant et les Sortilèges, M. Ravel, Stockholm
 L'Horloge Comtoise / Le Chat, L'Enfant et les Sortilèges, M. Ravel, Paris (Philharmonie)
 Valentin, Faust, C. Gounod, Paris (Bastille)
 Germont, La Traviata, G. Verdi, Berlin (Deutsche Oper)
 Hamlet, Hamlet, A. Thomas, Avignon
 Ford, Falstaff, G. Verdi, Marseille
 Guillaume Tell, Guillaume Tell, G. Rossini, Genève
 Marquis de la Force, Dialogues des Carmélites, F. Poulenc, Amsterdam

2016 

 Bardi, Dante, B. Godard, Munich, Versailles
 Germont, La Traviata, G. Verdi, Tampa (Floride)
 Siméon, L'Enfant prodigue, C. Debussy + L'Horloge Comtoise / Le Chat, L'Enfant et les Sortilèges, M. Ravel, Paris (Radio France)
 Zurga, Les Pêcheurs de perles, G. Bizet, Nancy
 Enrico, Lucia di Lammermoor, G. Donizetti, Nancy
 Hamlet, Hamlet, A. Thomas, Marseille
 Monsieur Beaucaire, Monsieur Beaucaire, A. Messager, Paris (Opéra Comique)
 Albert, Werther, J. Massenet, Bologne

2017 

 Wolfram, Tannhäuser, R. Wagner, Monaco
 Rodrigo, Don Carlo, G. Verdi, Marseille
 Ben, Le Téléphone, GC Menotti, Saint-Eustache (Québec)
 Alphonse XI, La Favorite, G. Donizetti, Marseille
 Benvenuto Cellini, Ascanio, C. Saint-Saëns, Genève

External links
 Official website
 Intermezzo Management
 Hamlet - Avignon - Metamag 

20th-century births
Living people
Canadian operatic baritones
Singers from Quebec
Year of birth missing (living people)